Eduardo Restrepo Sáenz (5 August 1886 – 17 October 1955) was a Colombian lawyer and historian, he served as the 2nd Colombian Ambassador to Peru as well as Minister of Foreign Affairs, Minister of Public Instruction, and Governor of the Department of Cundinamarca. He was also a founding member and president of the Colombian Academy of History.

Ambassadorship in Peru
In 1940, President Eduardo Santos Montejo named Restrepo Ambassador Extraordinary and Plenipotentiary of Colombia to Peru replacing Roberto Urdaneta Arbeláez. On 4 April 1940, Restrepo officially presented his Letters of Credence to President Manuel Prado y Ugarteche, but presented his resignation later that year being replaced by Francisco José Chaux Ferrer on 17 January 1941.

Personal life
He was born on 5 August 1886 in Bogotá, Colombia to José Ruperto Restrepo Montoya and María Teresa Justa Germana Ramona Sáenz Montoya. His paternal grandparents were José Manuel Restrepo Veléz and Mariana Montoya y Zapata, his maternal grandparents were José María Montoya Duque and María Josefa Zapata Ossa. He married Elvira del Corral Castellanos on 18 September 1899 and together had five children: Elvira, Ana, Leonor, Eduardo, and María.

See also
 Domingo Esguerra Plata
 Leopoldo Borda Roldan

References

1886 births
1955 deaths
People from Bogotá
20th-century Colombian lawyers
20th-century Colombian historians
Foreign ministers of Colombia
Colombian Ministers of Public Instruction
Governors of Cundinamarca Department
Ambassadors of Colombia to Peru